John Malkovich (born December 9, 1953) is an American actor. He is the recipient of several accolades, including a Primetime Emmy Award, in addition to nominations for two Academy Awards, a British Academy Film Award, two Screen Actors Guild Awards, and three Golden Globe Awards.

Malkovich has appeared in more than 70 films, including The Killing Fields (1984), Empire of the Sun (1987), Dangerous Liaisons (1988), Of Mice and Men (1992), In the Line of Fire (1993), Mulholland Falls (1996), Con Air (1997), Rounders (1998), Being John Malkovich (1999), The Messenger: The Story of Joan of Arc (1999), Shadow of the Vampire (2000), Ripley's Game (2002), Johnny English (2003), Burn After Reading (2008), Red (2010), Transformers: Dark of the Moon (2011), Warm Bodies (2013), Cesar Chavez (2014), Bird Box (2018), and Velvet Buzzsaw (2019). He has also produced films such as Ghost World (2001), Juno (2007), and The Perks of Being a Wallflower (2012).

From the 2010s Malkovich began to appear on television. His lead roles include Blackbeard in the NBC pirate drama Crossbones (2014), Hercule Poirot in the three-part BBC One mystery series The ABC Murders (2018), and the title character in the HBO drama series The New Pope (2020). He has additionally made recurring guest appearances as Russian billionaire/criminal Grigor Andolov in Billions (2018–19), and has a supporting role as Dr. Adrian Mallory in the Netflix comedy series Space Force (2020–2022).

Early life
Malkovich was born in Christopher, Illinois, on December 9, 1953. He grew up in Benton, Illinois. His father, Daniel Leon Malkovich, was a state conservation director, who published the conservation magazine Outdoor Illinois. His mother, Joe Anne (née Choisser), owned the Benton Evening News daily newspaper and Outdoor Illinois. He grew up with an older brother, Danny, and three younger sisters, Amanda, Rebecca, and Melissa. In a May 2020 interview, he revealed that Melissa is his only surviving sibling. His paternal grandparents were Croatian immigrants from the town of Ozalj; his other ancestry includes English, Scottish, French, and German descent. Malkovich attended Logan Grade School, Webster Junior High School, and Benton Consolidated High School. During his high-school years, he appeared in various plays and the musical Carousel. He was also active in a folk gospel group, with whom he sang at churches and community events. As a member of a local summer theater project, he co-starred in Jean-Claude van Itallie's America Hurrah in 1972.

After graduating from high school in 1972, Malkovich enrolled at Eastern Illinois University. He then transferred to Illinois State University, where he majored in theater, but dropped out. He studied acting at the William Esper Studio.

Career

Acting

In 1976, Malkovich, along with Joan Allen, Gary Sinise, and Glenne Headly, became a charter member of the Steppenwolf Theatre Company in Chicago. He moved to New York City in 1980 to appear in a Steppenwolf production of the Sam Shepard play True West for which he won an Obie Award.

In early 1982, he appeared in A Streetcar Named Desire with Chicago's Wisdom Bridge Theatre. Malkovich then directed a Steppenwolf co-production, the 1984 revival of Lanford Wilson's Balm in Gilead, for which he received a second Obie Award and a Drama Desk Award. His Broadway debut that year was as Biff in Death of a Salesman alongside Dustin Hoffman as Willy. Malkovich won an Emmy Award for this role when the play was adapted for television by CBS in 1985.

One of his first film roles was as an extra alongside Allen, Terry Kinney, George Wendt and Laurie Metcalf in Robert Altman's film A Wedding (1978). He made his feature film debut as Sally Field's blind boarder Mr. Will in Places in the Heart (1984). For his portrayal of Mr. Will, Malkovich received his first Academy Award nomination for Best Supporting Actor. He also portrayed Al Rockoff in The Killing Fields (1984).

He continued to have steady work in films such as Empire of the Sun, directed by Steven Spielberg, and the film adaptation of Tennessee Williams's The Glass Menagerie (both 1987) directed by Paul Newman (who appeared in the film) and Joanne Woodward. He then starred in Making Mr. Right (also 1987), directed by Susan Seidelman.

Malkovich gained significant critical and popular acclaim when he portrayed the sinister and sensual Valmont in the film Dangerous Liaisons (1988), a film adaptation of the stage play Les Liaisons Dangereuses by Christopher Hampton, who had adapted it from the 1782 novel of the same title by Pierre Choderlos de Laclos. He later reprised this role for the music video of "Walking on Broken Glass" by Annie Lennox. He played Port Moresby in The Sheltering Sky (1990), directed by Bernardo Bertolucci and appeared in Shadows and Fog (1991), directed by Woody Allen. In 1990, he recited, in Croatian, verses of the Croatian national anthem Lijepa naša domovino (Our Beautiful Homeland) in Nenad Bach's song "Can We Go Higher?"

Malkovich starred in the 1992 film adaptation of John Steinbeck's novella Of Mice and Men as Lennie alongside Gary Sinise as George. He was nominated for another Oscar, again in the Best Supporting Actor category, for In the Line of Fire (1993). He was the narrator for the film Alive (1993).

Malkovich was directed for the second time (after Dangerous Liaisons) by Stephen Frears in Mary Reilly (1996), a new adaptation of the Dr. Jekyll and Mr. Hyde tale, co-starring Julia Roberts. Malkovich also appeared in The Messenger: The Story of Joan of Arc (1999), directed by Luc Besson, playing the French king-to-be Charles VII. Though he played the title role in the Charlie Kaufman-penned Being John Malkovich (1999), he played a slight variation of himself, as indicated by the character's middle name of "Horatio".

Malkovich made a cameo appearance in Adaptation (2002) and appeared as himself during the filming of Being John Malkovich. The Dancer Upstairs, Malkovich's directorial film debut, was released in 2002. Around the same time, he played Patricia Highsmith's anti-hero Tom Ripley in Ripley's Game (also 2002), the second film adaptation of Highsmith's 1974 novel, the first being Wim Wenders' The American Friend (1977).

Malkovich's other film roles include The Man in the Iron Mask (1998), The Hitchhiker's Guide to the Galaxy (2005), Eragon (2006), Beowulf, Colour Me Kubrick (both 2007), Changeling (2008), Red, Secretariat (both 2010), Transformers: Dark of the Moon (2011), and Red 2 (2013). In 2000, Malkovich was approached to play Green Goblin in Spider-Man (2002) but he passed due to scheduling conflicts, Willem Dafoe was cast in the role. In 2009, Malkovich was approached and then cast for the role of the Marvel Comics villain Vulture in the unproduced Spider-Man 4. Malkovich in 2014 was the voice actor of Dave the octopus in the Penguins of Madagascar movie.

Malkovich has hosted three episodes of the NBC sketch show Saturday Night Live. The first occasion was in January 1989 with musical guest Anita Baker, the second in October 1993 with musical guest Billy Joel (and special appearance by former cast member Jan Hooks), and the third in December 2008 with musical guest T.I. with Swizz Beatz (and special appearances by Justin Timberlake, Molly Sims and Jamie-Lynn Sigler). In 2018, Malkovich appeared in a three-part adaptation of Agatha Christie's The A.B.C. Murders co-starring Rupert Grint for BBC television, playing the role of fictional Belgian detective Hercule Poirot.

In 2019, Malkovich performed in London's West End, starring in David Mamet’s new play Bitter Wheat. He also starred as the title character in the HBO drama series The New Pope (2020). On September 26, 2019, it was announced that Malkovich had been cast as Dr. Adrian Mallory in the current Netflix comedy series Space Force.

Directing
In 2011, he directed Julian Sands in A Celebration of Harold Pinter in the Pleasance Courtyard, Edinburgh for the Edinburgh Festival Fringe.

In 2008, Malkovich directed in French a theater production of Good Canary written by Zach Helm, with Cristiana Realli and Vincent Elbaz in the leading roles. Malkovich won the Molière Award best director for it. He also directed it in Spanish in Mexico, then in English at the Rose Theater in London in 2016. Ilan Goodman, Harry Lloyd and Freya Mavor were in the cast. Malkovich won the Milton Schulman Award for the best director at the Evening Standard Theater Awards in 2016.

In 2012, he directed a production of a newly adapted French-language version of Les Liaisons Dangereuses for the Théâtre de l'Atelier in Paris. The production had a limited engagement in July 2013 at the Lincoln Center for the Performing Arts in New York City.

Malkovich wrote and starred in a movie called 100 Years (2016), directed by Robert Rodriguez. The movie is locked in a vault in the south of France, not to be seen before 2115.

Fashion design
Malkovich created his own fashion company, Mrs. Mudd, in 2002. The company released its John Malkovich menswear collection, "Uncle Kimono", in 2003, which was subsequently covered in the international press, and its second clothing line, "Technobohemian", in 2010. Malkovich designed the outfits himself.

Frequent collaborators
Malkovich was directed many times by the Chilean director Raoul Ruiz — Le Temps retrouvé ("Time Regained", 1999), Les Ames Fortes ("Savage Souls", 2001), Klimt (2006) and Lines of Wellington (2012).

In 2008, directed by Michael Sturminger, he portrayed the story of Jack Unterweger in a performance for one actor, two sopranos, and period orchestra entitled Seduction and Despair, which premiered at Barnum Hall in Santa Monica, California. A fully staged version of the production, entitled The Infernal Comedy premiered in Vienna in July 2009. The show has since been performed in 2009, 2010, 2011 and 2012 throughout Europe, North America and South America.

Malkovich was also directed by the Austrian director Michael Sturminger in Casanova's Variations and its movie adaptation in 2014 (co-starring Fanny Ardant). For their third collaboration, in 2017, Michael Stürminger directed Malkovich in Just Call me God – the final speech, in which he played a Third World dictator called Satur Dinam Cha who is about to be overthrown.

He frequently works with Julian Sands.

Malkovich played the title role in the film The Great Buck Howard (2008), a role inspired by the mentalist "The Amazing Kreskin". Colin Hanks co-starred and his father, Tom Hanks, appeared as his on-screen father. In November 2009, Malkovich appeared in an advertisement for Nespresso with fellow actor George Clooney. He portrayed Quentin Turnbull in the film adaption of Jonah Hex (2010).

In the media
In 2014, the photographer Sandro Miller recreated 35 iconic portraits of John Malkovich as the subject, in a project called Malkovich, Malkovich, Malkovich: Homage to Photographer Master.

Malkovich starred in his first video game role in Call of Duty: Advanced Warfare in the "Exo Zombies" mode. In 1992 he appeared in period costume along with Hugh Laurie in the music video for "Walking on Broken Glass" by Annie Lennox. In 2015 he appeared in the music video for Eminem's single "Phenomenal". In 2017, he appeared in some humorous Super Bowl commercials portraying himself attempting to gain control of the johnmalkovich.com domain.

Personal life

Malkovich was married to actress Glenne Headly from 1982 to 1988, but they divorced after he had an affair with Michelle Pfeiffer. He began dating Nicoletta Peyran in 1989 after meeting her on the set of The Sheltering Sky, on which she was the second assistant director. Malkovich and Peyran have two children, Amandine and Loewy.

Malkovich has a distinctive voice, which The Guardian describes as "wafting, whispery, and reedy". He does not consider himself to be a method actor. He is fluent in French, having lived and worked in theater in southern France for nearly 10 years. He and his family left France in a dispute over taxes in 2003, and they have since lived in Cambridge, Massachusetts.

Malkovich is the co-owner of the restaurant Bica do Sapato and Lux nightclub in Lisbon. He lost millions of dollars in the Madoff investment scandal in 2008. He has raised funds for the Steppenwolf Theater Company, his sole charity.

Malkovich stated in a 2011 interview that he is not a "political person" and that he does not have "an ideology", revealing that he had not voted since George McGovern lost his presidential run in 1972. At the Cambridge Union Society in 2002, when asked whom he would most like to fight to the death, Malkovich replied that he would "rather just shoot" journalist Robert Fisk and politician George Galloway, stating that Galloway was not honest. Journalists speculated that the comment was related to criticism of Israel and the war in Iraq.

When asked in an interview with the Toronto Star in 2008 whether it was necessary to have spiritual beliefs to portray a spiritual character, he said, "No, I'd say not... I'm an atheist. I wouldn't say I'm without spiritual belief particularly, or rather, specifically. Maybe I'm agnostic, but I'm not quite sure there's some great creator somehow controlling everything and giving us free will. I don't know; it doesn't seem to make a lot of sense to me."

On June 6, 2013, Malkovich was walking in Toronto when a 77-year-old man named Jim Walpole tripped and accidentally cut his throat on a piece of scaffolding. Malkovich applied pressure to Walpole's neck to reduce bleeding before Walpole was rushed to a hospital, where he received stitches and later credited Malkovich with saving his life.

Awards and nominations

 Order of Danica Hrvatska (Croatia), with the face of Marko Marulić (Zagreb, 2003)
 Order of Merit (Ukraine), 3rd class (Kyiv, 2018)

References

External links

 
 
 
 John Malkovich on Box Office Mojo

1953 births
Living people
20th-century American male actors
21st-century American male actors
21st-century American male writers
21st-century American screenwriters
American male film actors
American male television actors
American atheists
American expatriates in England
American expatriates in France
American film producers
American male video game actors
American people of Croatian descent
American people of German descent
American people of Scottish descent
Drama Desk Award winners
Eastern Illinois University alumni
Film directors from Illinois
Illinois State University alumni
Male actors from Illinois
Obie Award recipients
Outstanding Performance by a Supporting Actor in a Miniseries or Movie Primetime Emmy Award winners
People from Benton, Illinois
People from Christopher, Illinois
Recipients of the Order of Merit (Ukraine), 3rd class
Screenwriters from Illinois
Steppenwolf Theatre Company players
William Esper Studio alumni